Sea Lapland occupies the most southwest region of Finnish Lapland.

Two cities and three other municipalities form the Sea Lapland area: The cities of Tornio and Kemi, and the municipalities of Keminmaa, Simo and Tervola. The three rivers, the Simojoki, Kemijoki and Tornionjoki, all flowing down to the Gulf of Bothnia, are situated in the region. Tornio is also called TornioHaparanda together with the neighbouring border city Haparanda. The population of the area is around 60 000 inhabitants.

Industry, trade, seafaring, agriculture and tourism are important means of livelihood in Sea Lapland. Known sights are for example The Snowcastle in Kemi, Icebreaker Sampo and the Kukkolankoski village.

Gallery

See also
 Peräpohjola

Notes

External links
 Visit Sea Lapland page

Lapland (Finland)